Nadodi Thendral is a 1992 Indian Tamil-language historical romance film, directed by Bharathiraja and written by Sujatha. It stars Karthik and Ranjitha. The music was provided by Ilaiyaraaja. Featuring an international cast, the film was a period movie set in British India and was based on a love triangle between a goldsmith (Karthik), a gypsy woman (Ranjitha) and the district collector's sister.

Plot 

The story is based on a love triangle between Karthik, Ranjitha and an Englishwoman (District collector's daughter) during the British occupation in India. Karthik is a goldsmith's son, so he is too and Ranjitha is a gypsy woman has a poultry. At the start they both collide and very soon both falls for each other. Meanwhile, Karthik's bravery impresses the District Collector's sister's heart as well. The rest of the movie deals with how the lovers unite with the help of the Englishwoman.

Cast 
Karthik as Thangarasu
Ranjitha as Poonguruvi
Pandiyan
Kripa as the Englishwoman
Kavitha
Vandhana
Janagaraj
Richard Reidy
Napoleon

Production 
The art direction was handled by P. Krishnamoorthy.

Soundtrack 
The lyrics and music was composed by Ilaiyaraaja. This was the last collaboration between him and Bharathiraja. The song "All The Time" is predominantly in English.

Reception 
N. Krishnaswamy of The Indian Express wrote it is "a love story that is simple without being superficial, commercial without losing sight of values, artistic without being obscure."

References

External links 

1990s historical romance films
1990s Tamil-language films
1992 films
Films directed by Bharathiraja
Films scored by Ilaiyaraaja
Films set in the British Raj
Indian historical romance films